This is a list of Canadian television related events from 2005.

Events

Debuts

Ending this year

Television shows

1950s
Country Canada (1954–2007)
Hockey Night in Canada (1952–present, sports telecast)
The National (1954–present, news program)

1960s
CTV National News (1961–present)
Land and Sea (1964–present)
The Nature of Things (1960–present, scientific documentary series)
Question Period (1967–present, news program)
W-FIVE (1966–present, newsmagazine program)

1970s
Canada AM (1972–present, news program)
the fifth estate (1975–present, newsmagazine program)
Marketplace (1972–present, newsmagazine program)
100 Huntley Street (1977–present, religious program)

1980s
CityLine (1987–present, news program)
Fashion File (1989–2009)
Just For Laughs (1988–present)
On the Road Again (1987–2007)
Venture (1985–2007)

1990s
CBC News Morning (1999–present)
Cold Squad (1998–2005)
Da Vinci's Inquest (1998–2005)
Daily Planet (1995–present)
eTalk (1995–present, entertainment newsmagazine program)
Life and Times (1996–2007)
The Passionate Eye (1993–present)
The Newsroom (1996–2005)
The Red Green Show (1991–2006)
Royal Canadian Air Farce (1993–2008, comedy sketch series)
Yvon of the Yukon (1999–2005, children's animated series)

2000s
Atomic Betty (2004–present, children's animated series)
Les Bougon (2004–2006)
Call for Help 2.0 (2004–2007, computer technical help series)
Canadian Idol (2003–2008)
CBC News: Sunday Night (2004–present)
Chilly Beach (2003–present, animated series)
Class of the Titans (2005–2008, animated series)
Corner Gas (2004–2009)
Canada's Worst Driver (2005–present, reality series)
Le Cœur a ses raisons (2005–present)
The Collector (2004–2006)
Da Vinci's City Hall (2005–2006)
Degrassi: The Next Generation (2001–present)
Edgemont (2001–2005)
ET Canada (2005–present)
Global Currents (2005–present, newsmagazine/documentary series)
The Hour (2005–present, talk show)
Instant Star (2004–2008)
Intelligence (2005–2007)
JR Digs (2001–present)
Kenny vs. Spenny (2002–2010, comedy reality series)
Metropia (2004–2006)
Naked Josh (2004–2006)
Naturally, Sadie (2005–2007)
Odd Job Jack (animated series, 2003–present)
Paradise Falls (2001–present)
ReGenesis (2004–2008)
Restaurant Makeover (2005–2008)
Rick Mercer Report (2004–present)
Robson Arms (2005–2008)
6Teen (2004–present, animated series)
Slings and Arrows (2003–2006)
This Is Wonderland (2004–2006)
Trailer Park Boys (2001–2008)
Train 48 (2003–2005)
What's with Andy (2001–2007, children's animated series)

TV movies
 Terry
 
 Plague City: SARS in Toronto

Television stations

Network affiliation changes

See also
 2005 in Canada
 List of Canadian films of 2005

References